Neosarmatium smithi, is a swimming crab species in the genus Neosarmatium. Distributed all over marine and brackish waters of Indo-West Pacific regions.

Distribution
A mangrove inhabitant, it is found all over South Africa, Madagascar, Mauritius, India, Sri Lanka, Malaysia, Japan, China, Philippines, Thailand, Singapore, Indonesia, Vietnam and Australia.

Description
Carapace surface smooth and shining.

Ecology
The species is well distributed in mangrove regions, feeds on decaying mangrove leaves of Rhizophora mucronata predominantly.

References

External links
Diversity of mangrove crabs in Kadolkele, Negombo eatuary, Sri Lanka
Consumption of mangrove litter by the crabs Sesarma messa and Sesarma smithii in north eastern Australia
Feeding ecology of mangrove crabs in North Eastern Australia: mangrove litter consumption by Sesarma messa and Sesarma smithii
Competition and interaction between Neosarmatium smithi (Crustacea: Grapsidae) and Terebralia palustris (Mollusca: Gastropoda) in a Kenyan mangrove
Neosarmatium smithi - Biological Information System for Marine Life

Portunoidea
Crustaceans described in 1940